Cuckoo Electronics Co., Ltd. (Hangul:쿠쿠전자) is a South Korean manufacturing firm founded in 1978 and originally incorporated as Sunkwang Electronics Co., Ltd.   Its corporate identity was formally changed to Cuckoo Co., Ltd. in 2002 reflecting its major export brand name which had been in use since 1999. The company's headquarters is located in Yangsan.

Cuckoo manufacturers small home appliances, notably Korean-style pressure rice cookers. Korean-style cookers (0.8 kg to 0.9 kg cooking pressure) typically gelatinize rice starches more completely than Japanese-style cookers (0.4 kg to 0.6 kg cooking pressure) resulting in a more glutinous and marginally more nutritious cooked rice. In South Korea Cuckoo is the top-selling brand of rice cooker. In 2002, Cuckoo started selling to distributors in New York and Los Angeles. In late 2016, Cuckoo established its first American branch, Cuckoo Electronics America, Inc. in Los Angeles, California.

CUCKOO was introduced in Malaysia in October 2014 by Hoe Kian Choon. As CUCKOO International, the brand established CUCKOO in other countries including Brunei, Singapore and Indonesia. Since becoming the Southeast Asian hub, CUCKOO has plans to expand the brand in other countries in the region.

Markets
South Korea
USA (since 2002)
Japan (since 2002) - also OEM to Matsushita  (Panasonic/National brands)
China (since 2003)
Malaysia (since 2014)
Brunei (since 2016)
Indonesia (since 2018)
India
Australia
Europe

Major competitors

South Korea 
Bubang Techron Co., Ltd. under brand name Lihom is ranked the 8th in Korea.
Samsung under brand name Novita is ranked 7th in Korea.

Japan 
Zojirushi
Tiger Corporation
Panasonic
Sony
Hitachi
Sanyo

Product lines
Rice Cookers
Pressurized (Induction Heating and Conventional Heater Plate models)
Conventional
Hot water pots
Pressurized
Conventional
Water Purifiers
Room Air Conditioning Units
Air Filtration Devices
Room Humidifiers
Vacuums
Electric Grills
Dish sanitizers

Brand marks
 Cuckoo

External links
 CUCKOO Homesys Co., Ltd.
 CUCKOO International (MAL) Sdn. Bhd.
 CUCKOO WONDERKLEAN Official Website
 CUCKOO WONDERLAB Official Website
 CUCKOO Indonesia Official Website
 CUCKOO Indonesia Official Instagram Account
 CUCKOO Malaysia Product Information Website

Home appliance manufacturers of South Korea
South Korean brands
Companies listed on the Korea Exchange
Manufacturing companies established in 1978
South Korean companies established in 1978